A penumbral lunar eclipse took place on Wednesday, August 15, 1962.

Visibility

Related lunar eclipses

Lunar year series

Tzolkinex 
 Followed: Lunar eclipse of September 25, 1969

See also
List of lunar eclipses
List of 20th-century lunar eclipses

Notes

External links

1962-08
1962 in science